Happy Monday may refer to
Happy Mondays, an English alternative rock band
Happy Monday System, public holidays shifted to Mondays in Japan